Yaloke-Bossembele is a sub-prefecture of the Ombella-M'Poko Prefecture of the western Central African Republic. It combines the main towns of Bossembele and Yaloke and the surrounding villages.

Sub-prefectures of the Central African Republic
Ombella-M'Poko